Au Gres may refer to a location in the United States:

 Au Gres, Michigan
 Au Gres Township, Michigan
 The Au Gres River in Michigan